Bridlington Lifeboat Station is a  Royal National Lifeboat Institution (RNLI) lifeboat station based in Bridlington, East Riding of Yorkshire, England. Having been instituted in 1805, it is the oldest working RNLI lifeboat location in the Yorkshire and the Humber region.

A new lifeboat station was opened closer to the sea in September 2017, replacing an older facility built in 1903. There are two lifeboats based at Bridlington; Antony Patrick Jones, a  Class All-Weather Lifeboat (ALB) and '’Ernie Wellings, a  D-Class Lifeboat (ILB).

History
In 1804, the residents of Bridlington raised the £150 needed to pay for a lifeboat, which became operational in 1805 with the first lifeboat house recorded as being operational in 1806. In December 1852, the local committee in charge of the boat relinquished control to the RNLI after they took the decision not to launch during bad weather. This was seen as the wrong decision, as three men on a stricken ship drowned, and so the committee decided the best option was to transfer control to the RNLI.

A lifeboat station was built near to the harbour, but was vacated in 1903 in favour of a new build slightly to the south along Marine Drive.

In 1871, a huge storm hit the east coast of England and became known as the Great Gale of 1871. Many boats were wrecked, including The Harbinger, a private lifeboat which is sometimes erroneously referred to as an RNLI boat. The storm took its toll on dozens of ships, which were trying to stay safe in Bridlington Bay, which was sometimes referred to as the Bay of Safety. Between 70 and 150 people died, including six members of the lifeboat crew from The Harbinger. At the time, the RNLI boat was known as the Institution Boat and The Harbinger was known as the Fishermen's Boat. After the gale, it was commented upon by some, that the design of The Harbinger led to its capsizing. A local benefactor paid for a new boat (The Seagull), of a new design and paid for a lifeboathouse to accommodate it, something that The Harbinger never had and she later became weathered after being exposed to the elements.

A lifeboat station was opened in 1903 on South Marine Drive, and in 1921, along with  Lifeboat Station, Bridlington undertook trials in launching lifeboats across open beaches into water with the aid of a specially adapted tractor.

In 2017, the previous lifeboat station on South Marine Drive in the town, was replaced with a larger facility on the seashore which enabled the RNLI to house both their All-Weather Lifeboat (ALB) and their Inshore Lifeboat (ILB) in the same facility. Previous to this, the ILB was housed in a separate facility from the ALB. The new build lifeboat station also allows the launch vehicle and boat to stay permanently fixed when not in use. This allows for a speedier deployment into the sea when an emergency call is made.

Notable launches

Great Gale of 1871

The Bridlington RNLI Lifeboat was launched many times and rescued 16 people from three wrecked ships. The local rescue boat, Harbinger, a gift from Count Gustave Batthyany, also took to the sea and rescued sailors, but capsized and six of her crew of nine were drowned.

Seagull Lifeboat (1898)
After the sinking of The Harbinger, a private donation paid for a second lifeboat (outwith of the RNLI's responsibility) which was called The Seagull. This operated in conjunction with the RNLI lifeboat until 25 March 1898, when the RNLI were called out to rescue the crew of The Seagull. The Seagull had been dashed against the sea-wall and ropes had been thrown to aid the crew. One of the RNLI crewman who had been decorated for his bravery during the Great Gale of 1871, drowned during the rescue.

March 1915
Whilst the lifeboat was being launched to go to a stricken Minesweeper in Bridlington bay, one of the carriage horse riders was knocked off his horse, swept out to sea and drowned. Two of the horses and all twelve sailors aboard the minesweeper drowned too.

The Tillie Morrison, Sheffield (1952)
On 19 August 1952, two girls, Joan Ellis and Gillian Fox, were swimming in the sea off the coast at Flamborough when they got into difficulties. The  lifeboat could not be launched as its slipway was under repair, so the Bridlington lifeboat, the Tillie Morrison, Sheffield'' was launched instead. Unfortunately, both girls drowned and during the search, and the lifeboat was capsized by rough seas, killing one of the lifeboatmen, bowman Robert Redhead. It was later speculated that the Bridlington lifeboat crew were unfamiliar with the area they were searching, and so were not aware of the dangerous waters around Flamborough Head.  A plaque at Thornwick Bay commemorates the tragedy.

Fleet
The Archbishop of York, Dr John Sentamu, named the current  Class Lifeboat in April 2018, but the boat had been operational since November 2017.

References

Sources

Lifeboat stations in Yorkshire
Buildings and structures in the East Riding of Yorkshire
Bridlington